Fayettoceras is a genus in the nautiloid family Valcouroceratidae, part of the order Oncocerida, Fayettoceras has a shell which is a depressed cyrtocone with a ventral cyrtochoanitic siphuncle of elongated ovoid segments strongly contracted at the septal necks. The internal structure is unknown.

Fayettoceras was named by Foeste in 1932.  Its fossils have been found in the Upper Ordovician of Indiana and ?Wisconsin in the United States.

References

 Walter C Sweet, 1964  Nautiloidea-Oncocerida.  Treatise on Invertebrate Paleontology Part K Mollusca 3. Geological Society of America and University of Kansas Press.

Prehistoric nautiloid genera
Oncocerida